Variemarginula is a genus of sea snails, marine gastropod mollusks in the family Fissurellidae, the keyhole limpets and slit limpets.

Species
Species within the genus Variemarginula include:
Variemarginula fujitai (Habe, 1963)
Variemarginula pileata Gould, 1859 
Variemarginula punctata (Adams, 1852)
Variemarginula variegata (Adams, 1852)

References

External links
 To World Register of Marine Species

Fissurellidae